Fung Ging-man, (22 January 1912 – 9 November 1997) sometimes credited as Ging-man Fung and Fung King-Man, was a Cantonese Hong Kong actor, script supervisor, production manager and director. He acted in over 300 films, and he also played as himself in Bruce Lee, the Man and the Legend, which starred Bruce Lee.

History
Fung was born in the city of Shanghai in 1912, eventually moving to Nanjing as a child. At the age of twenty, he moved to Hong Kong, and began acting in films such as The Mad Woman in 1937, produced by Nanyang Film Company. In 1954, Fung started became a production manager, and he produced 21 films. He also planned a movie in 1954 called The Lover with a Heart of Steel. His final movie role before his death was The Fun, the Luck & the Tycoon in 1990.

Death
On 9 November 1997, Fung has died at the age of 85.

References

External links

1912 births
1997 deaths
20th-century Hong Kong male actors
Hong Kong film producers
Hong Kong male film actors
Cantonese people